Artem Kalashian (born 9 December 1996) is a Russian Paralympic athlete who specializes in sprints. He represented Russian Paralympic Committee athletes at the 2020 Summer Paralympics.

Career
Kalashian represented Russian Paralympic Committee athletes at the 2020 Summer Paralympics in the men's 100 metres T35 event and won a bronze medal.

References

1996 births
Living people
Paralympic athletes of Russia
Medalists at the World Para Athletics European Championships
Medalists at the World Para Athletics Championships
Athletes (track and field) at the 2020 Summer Paralympics
Medalists at the 2020 Summer Paralympics
Paralympic medalists in athletics (track and field)
Paralympic bronze medalists for the Russian Paralympic Committee athletes
Russian male sprinters
21st-century Russian people